Heves is a district in south-eastern part of Heves County. Heves is also the name of the town where the district seat is found. The district is located in the Northern Hungary Statistical Region.

Geography 
Heves District borders with Füzesabony District to the northeast, Kunhegyes District (Jász-Nagykun-Szolnok County) to the southeast, Jászapáti District (Jász-Nagykun-Szolnok County) to the southwest, Gyöngyös District to the northwest. The number of the inhabited places in Heves District is 17.

Municipalities 
The district has 2 towns and 15 villages.
(ordered by population, as of 1 January 2012)

The bolded municipalities are cities.

Demographics

In 2011, it had a population of 35,036 and the population density was 50/km².

Ethnicity
Besides the Hungarian majority, the main minority is the Roma (approx. 5,500).

Total population (2011 census): 35,036
Ethnic groups (2011 census): Identified themselves: 35,799 persons:
Hungarians: 30,343 (84.76%)
Gypsies: 5,182 (14.48%)
Others and indefinable: 274 (0.77%)
Approx. 1,000 persons in Heves District did declare more than one ethnic group at the 2011 census.

Religion
Religious adherence in the county according to 2011 census:

Catholic – 19,112 (Roman Catholic – 19,045; Greek Catholic – 64);
Reformed – 1,932;
Evangelical – 66; 
other religions – 454; 
Non-religious – 5,095; 
Atheism – 158;
Undeclared – 8,219.

Gallery

See also
List of cities and towns of Hungary

References

External links
 Postal codes of the Heves District

Districts in Heves County